The University of Toulouse was a university in the French city of Toulouse that was established by papal bull in 1229, making it one of the earliest universities to emerge in Europe. Suppressed during the French Revolution in 1793, it was re-founded in 1896 as part of the reorganization of higher education.  It finally disappeared in 1969, giving birth to the three current Toulouse universities: the University Toulouse-I-Capitole, the University Toulouse-II-Jean-Jaurès and the University Toulouse-III-Paul-Sabatier.

The current consortium of Universities and other institutions of higher education and research in the Toulouse area is also known as Université fédérale de Toulouse Midi-Pyrénées.

The three Universities, along with other Toulouse schools, are participating in the reconstruction of a University of Toulouse – a joint structure of 107,000 students including 4,500 doctoral students, approximately 17,000 staff, 145 research laboratories.  The mission called "UT2022" was entrusted to Patrick Lévy, former president of the University of Grenoble-Alpes, accompanied by the president of the Université fédérale de Toulouse Midi-Pyrénées, Philippe Raimbault.  This development, strongly desired by the elected officials of the Occitanie region and Toulouse Métropole, aims to give greater visibility to Toulouse higher education in international rankings.

History
The formation of l'Université de Toulouse was imposed on Count Raymond VII as a part of the Treaty of Paris in 1229 ending the crusade against the Albigensians. As he was suspected of sympathizing with the heretics, Raymond VII had to finance the teaching of theology. Bishop Foulques de Toulouse was among the founders of the university. Among its first lecturers were Jean de Garlande and Roland of Cremona. Other faculties (law, medicine) were added later. Initially, the university was located in the center of the city, together with the ancestors of student residences, the colleges.

In 1969, l'Université de Toulouse split into three separate universities and numerous specialised institutions of higher education. The present-day Université de Toulouse was founded on 27 March 2007. It no longer represents a single university, as it is now the collective entity which federates the universities and specialised institutions of higher education. With more than 100,000 students, Midi-Pyrénées is the fifth-largest university area in France.

Members and fields of study

It is a Research and Higher Education Cluster consisting of:

 Université Toulouse 1 Capitole – UT1 (Law, Economics, Management)
 Université Toulouse –  Jean Jaurès – UT2J (Arts, Literature, Humanities and Languages)
 Université Toulouse III – Paul Sabatier – UT3 (Science, Technologies and Health)
 Institut National Polytechnique de Toulouse – INPT (Engineering)
 École Nationale Supérieure Agronomique de Toulouse – INP-ENSAT (Agronomy)
 École Nationale Supérieure d’Électrotechnique, d’Électronique, d’Informatique, d’Hydraulique et des Télécommunications – INP-ENSEEIHT (Engineering)
 École Nationale Supérieure des Ingénieurs en Arts Chimiques et Technologiques – INP-ENSIACET (Engineering)
 École Nationale d'Ingénieurs de Tarbes – INP-ENIT (Engineering)
 École Nationale de la Météorologie – INP-ENM (Meteorology)
 École d'ingénieurs de Purpan – INP-EI Purpan (Agronomy)
 École Nationale Vétérinaire de Toulouse – ENVT (Veterinary Studies)
 Institut National des Sciences Appliquées de Toulouse – INSA Toulouse (Engineering)
 Institut Supérieur de l'Aéronautique et de l'Espace – ISAE (Engineering)
 Centre Universitaire de Formation et de Recherche Jean-François Champollion – CUFR Champollion (Several fields of study on offer)
 École des Mines d'Albi-Carmaux – EMAC (Engineering)
 École Nationale de l'Aviation Civile – ENAC (Civil Aviation)
 École nationale supérieure de formation de l’enseignement agricole – ENSFEA (Agronomy)
 École Nationale Supérieur d'Architecture de Toulouse – ENSA Toulouse (Architecture)
 Toulouse Business School (ESC Toulouse) (Business and Commerce)
 Institut d'études politiques de Toulouse – IEP/Sciences Po Toulouse (Political Studies)
 Institut Catholique d'Arts et Métiers de Toulouse – ICAM Toulouse (Engineering)

Doctoral schools
The Doctoral Schools are all members of the Research and Doctoral Department of the Université de Toulouse : 15 Doctoral Schools
representing a research potential of 4200 Scientists including 2400 Senior Scientists; 4200 PhD students and 800 Doctorate diplomas
awarded per year.

In the field of experimental sciences and science and technology
 Biology, Health & Biotechnologies
 Sciences for Ecology, Veterinary, Agronomy & Bioengineery
 Geosciences, Astrophysics & Space Sciences
 Mathematics, Informatics & Telecommunications Toulouse Doctoral School
 Electrical, Electronic Engineering & Telecommunications 
 Systems 
 Physics, Chemistry & Materials Sciences 
 Mechanics, Energetics, Civil & Process Engineering
 Aeronautics & Astronautics

In the field of Human Sciences and Social Sciences and Humanities
 Behavior, Language, Education, Socialisation, Cognition
 Art, Literatures, Languages, Philosophy, Information & Communication
 Time, Spaces, Societies & Cultures
 Legal & Political Sciences
 Management Sciences
 Toulouse School of Economics

Present and past faculty include
 Paul Sabatier, (chemist) (1854–1941), Dean of the Faculty of Science at the University of Toulouse in 1905. Nobel Prize in Chemistry jointly with fellow Frenchman Victor Grignard in 1912.
 Adrianus Turnebus, (1512 – 12 June 1565), classical scholar.
 Pierre Laromiguière, (3 November 1756 – 12 August 1837), philosopher.
 Jean Jaurès, (3 September 1859 – 31 July 1914), politician.
 Paul Fauconnet, (1874–1938), sociologist.
 Raymond Aron, (14 March 1905, Paris – 17 October 1983) philosopher, sociologist and political scientist.
 Jean-Jacques Laffont, (13 April 1947 – 1 May 2004), economist.
 Jean Tirole, (born 9 August 1953), professor of economics, Nobel Prize in economic sciences in 2014.
 Paul Seabright, (born 8 July 1958), professor of economics.

Famous alumni and former students
 Étienne Dolet (1509–1546), French scholar, translator and printer.
 Michael Servetus (1511–1553), Spanish theologian and physician.
 Michel de Montaigne (1533–1592), French philosopher and moralist.
 Vincent de Paul (1581–1660), French Catholic priest.
 Henry de Puyjalon, (1841–1905), French/Canadian pioneer in biology and ecology.
 Selman Riza, (5 February 1872 – 5 October 1931), linguist and politician.
 Mustafa Kamil Pasha (1874–1908), Egyptian lawyer, journalist, activist, and nationalist leader.
 Armand Praviel (1875–1944, Doctor of Law 1901), French writer and journalist.
 Marcel Dassault (1892–1986, graduated in 1913 from ISAE), French aircraft industrialist. He founded the company Dassault Aviation.
Henri Koch-Kent (1905–1999), Luxemburger anti-fascist activist, author, historian 
 François Hussenot (1912–1951, graduated in 1935 from ISAE aeronautical engineer credited with the invention of one of the early forms of the flight data recorder.
 Abdul Hafeez Mirza, (born 1939, graduated in 1964), Pakistani Tourism worker, professor of French language and a cultural activist, recipient of the Ordre des Palmes Academiques in 2015.
 Saeed Abu Ali, (born 1955), Palestinian politician and  Assistant Secretary-General of the League of Arab Nations.
 Jean Castex (born 25 June 1965), French Prime Minister, from 3 July 2020 to 16 May 2022. 
 Thomas Pesquet (born in 1978, graduated in 2001 from ISAE), European Space Agency astronaut.

'''Sport'* Thomas Castaignède, (born 1975, graduated from INSA Toulouse), rugby union footballer, played with the France national team
 Romain Mesnil (born 1977, graduated in 2001 from INSA Toulouse), French Pole vaulter
 Jean Bouilhou, (born 1978, graduated in 2002 from INSA Toulouse), rugby union footballer, played with the France national team
 David Skrela, (born 1979, graduated in 2003 from INSA Toulouse), rugby union footballer, played with the France national team

See also

 List of medieval universities
 Pôle de recherche et d'enseignement supérieur
 List of split up universities

Notes and references

External links
 Université de Toulouse
 Université de Toulouse I: Capitole
 Université de Toulouse II: Le Mirail
 Université de Toulouse III: Paul Sabatier
 National Polytechnique de Toulouse – INPT
 École Nationale Supérieure Agronomique de Toulouse – INP-ENSAT
 École Nationale Supérieure d’Électrotechnique, d’Électronique, d’Informatique, d’Hydraulique et des Télécommunications – INP-ENSEEIHT
 École Nationale Supérieure des Ingénieurs en Arts Chimiques et Technologiques – INP-ENSIACET
 École Nationale d'Ingénieurs de Tarbes – ENIT
 École Nationale de Météorologie – INP-ENM
 École d'Ingénieurs de Purpan – EI Purpan
 École Nationale Vétérinaire de Toulouse – ENVT
 Institut National des Sciences Appliquées de Toulouse – INSA Toulouse
 Institut Supérieur de l'Aéronautique et de l'Espace – ISAE
 Centre Universitaire de Formation et de Recherche Jean-François Champollion – CUFR Champollion
 École des Mines d'Albi-Carmaux – EMAC
 École Nationale de l'Aviation Civile – ENAC
 École Nationale de Formation Agronomique – ENFA
 École Nationale Supérieur d'Architecture de Toulouse – ENSA Toulouse
 Toulouse Business School
 Institut d'études politiques de Toulouse – IEP/Sciences Po Toulouse
 Institut Catholique d'Arts et Métiers de Toulouse – ICAM Toulouse
 Search Scholarships at University De Toulouse 

 
Toulouse
Universities and colleges in Toulouse
1229 establishments in Europe
1220s establishments in France
1793 disestablishments in France
Educational institutions established in the 13th century
Educational institutions established in 2007
2007 establishments in France